Frédéric Chartier (born May 31, 1975) is a Canadian former ice hockey player. He won the Michel Brière Memorial Trophy as the Most Valuable Player in the Quebec Major Junior Hockey League for his outstanding play with the Laval Titan during the 1994–95 QMJHL season.

Career statistics

References

External links

1975 births
Sportspeople from Trois-Rivières
Ice hockey people from Quebec
Laval Titan players
Living people
Laval Titan Collège Français players
Beauport Harfangs players
French Quebecers
Canadian ice hockey right wingers